Charles Edward Snodgrass (December 28, 1866 – August 3, 1936) was an American politician and a member of the United States House of Representatives for the 4th congressional district of Tennessee.

Biography
Snodgrass was born on December 28, 1866, near Sparta, Tennessee, in White County, son of Thomas and Eliza Jane Evans Snodgrass. He attended the common schools, studied law, and was admitted to the bar. He commenced practice in Crossville, Tennessee, in 1888. He married  Lola Adel Webb on June 30, 1889,  and they had nine children.

Career
Elected as a Democrat to the Fifty-sixth and Fifty-seventh Congresses, Snodgrass served from March 4, 1899, to March 3, 1903,  and was an unsuccessful candidate for re-election in 1902.

Snodgrass was a judge of the fifth judicial circuit of Tennessee. He was appointed and subsequently elected judge of the court of appeals upon the reorganization of that court and served from 1925 to 1934 when he retired to private life in Crossville, Tennessee.

Death
On August 3, 1936, Snodgrass died in Crossville at age 69 years, 219 days. He is interred at Crossville City Cemetery. He was the nephew of fellow Tennessee congressman Henry C. Snodgrass, and father-in-law of World War I Medal of Honor recipient Milo Lemert.

The building on the courthouse square in Crossville where Snodgrass and his son practiced law has been renamed in his honor.

References

External links

 

1866 births
1936 deaths
Democratic Party members of the United States House of Representatives from Tennessee
Tennessee state court judges
People from Crossville, Tennessee